Cognitive and Behavioral Neurology is a quarterly peer-reviewed medical journal covering cognitive neurology. It was established in 1988 as Neuropsychiatry, Neuropsychology & Behavioral Neurology, obtaining its current title in 2003. The journal is published by Lippincott Williams & Wilkins and the editor-in-chief is Barry Gordon (Johns Hopkins Medical Institutions). It is an official journal of the Society for Behavioral and Cognitive Neurology.

Abstracting and indexing
The journal is abstracted and indexed in:
Current Contents/Clinical Medicine
Embase
Index Medicus/MEDLINE/PubMed
PsycINFO
Science Citation Index Expanded
Scopus
According to the Journal Citation Reports, the journal has a 2021 impact factor of 1.590.

References

External links

Neurology journals
Lippincott Williams & Wilkins academic journals
Quarterly journals
English-language journals
Publications established in 1988
Cognitive science journals